Someday We'll All Be Free is the sixteenth studio album by American singer-songwriter Bobby Womack. The album was released in 1985, by Beverly Glen Music.

Track listing

Personnel
Bobby Womack - vocals, guitar
Charles Fearing, Craig T. Cooper, David T. Walker - guitar
Abraham Laboriel, David Shields, Freddie Washington, James Jamerson, Nathan East - bass guitar
Dale Ramsey, Patrick Moten - keyboards
Clarence McDonald, Dean Gant, Lathan Omar, Ramsey Embick - synthesizer
Craig T. Cooper, Harvey Mason, James Gadson, Ricky Lawson - drums, drum machine
Dorothy Ashby - harp
Eddie "Bongo" Brown, Paulinho Da Costa - percussion
Don Myrick - saxophone
Chuck Findley, Gary Grant, Jerry Hey - trumpet
Angela Winbush, Marva King, The Waters, Van Ross Redding, Vesta Williams - backing vocals
Technical
Otis Smith - executive producer
Norman Seeff - cover photography

References

1985 albums
Bobby Womack albums
Albums produced by Bobby Womack
Albums produced by Andrew Loog Oldham